Dion Esajas (born 7 November 1980 in Amsterdam, Netherlands) is a professional football forward who plays for Dutch amateur side EDO.

Club career
He started his professional career with HFC Haarlem in 1997, making his debut on 14 March 1998 in a 3–3 draw against Excelsior. He later moved to FC Volendam, where he played his only season in the Eredivisie, which was 2003–04. He later played for FC Zwolle and in 2006 moved to Germany, where he had a disappointing spell with SC Paderborn 07 and then returned to Netherlands to play with Quick Boys. After a season in Holland, he moved abroad to play in Cyprus for several years when he signed for Akritas Chlorakas. He also played for PAEEK, AEK Kouklia, Karmiotissa, ENAD Polis Chrysochous and Anagennisi Dherynia before returning to Holland.

In summer 2016, Esajas joined EDO from fellow amateur side Nieuw Utrecht.

References

External links
Dion Esajas 
CFA profile

1980 births
Living people
Footballers from Amsterdam
Dutch sportspeople of Surinamese descent
Association football forwards
Dutch footballers
HFC Haarlem players
FC Volendam players
PEC Zwolle players
SC Paderborn 07 players
Quick Boys players
FC Lisse players
Akritas Chlorakas players
PAEEK players
AEK Kouklia F.C. players
Karmiotissa FC players
Anagennisi Deryneia FC players
HFC EDO players
Cypriot Second Division players
Eredivisie players
Eerste Divisie players
2. Bundesliga players
Dutch expatriate footballers
Expatriate footballers in Germany
Dutch expatriate sportspeople in Germany
Expatriate footballers in Cyprus
Dutch expatriate sportspeople in Cyprus